Bar Kamar is an area of Mamund Tehsil, Bajaur Agency, Federally Administered Tribal Areas, Pakistan. The population is 1,787 according to the 2017 census.

History 

In May 2015, 6 people, including Muhammad Jan, an elder of the Mamund tribe, were killed in a remote-controlled blast.  Jan's vehicle passed an improvised explosive device on the roadside.

References 

Populated places in Bajaur District